Yisrael Hasson (born 27 April 1955) is an Israeli politician and former Deputy Director of Shin Bet. He served as a member of the Knesset for Yisrael Beiteinu and Kadima between 2006 and 2014, before becoming Chairman of the Israel Antiquities Authority.

Biography
Hasson was born in Damascus, and made aliyah to Israel at the age of seven. He served in Shin Bet for twenty-three years, and is considered a celebrated agents' recruiter and operations leader. He was involved in the negotiations behind the Wye River, Taba, and Hebron agreements, as well as Ehud Barak's negotiations in Camp David. He has also been Israel's envoy to Arab countries on numerous occasions. During his last position in the Shabak, he was nominated as its Deputy Director, under Ami Ayalon.

In 2000, after Avi Dichter was preferred over him as Shabak Director, Hasson resigned from the organization and entered business. He founded the Hasson Energy company which delivers fuel to factories and gas stations in Israel's north, and also traded with the Palestinian National Authority. He was voted into the seventeenth Knesset in the 2006 elections.

In 2006 Hasson proposed a Knesset bill which require the internet websites to identify and tag every talkbacker who clicks on the talkback button, stating "I'm not seeking censorship... I only want people to know they must take responsibility for the words they write – just as they are responsible for what they say before a live audience."

In November 2008, Hasson left Yisrael Beiteinu to join Kadima. The immediate reason, while not official, is generally believed to be Lieberman's statements condemning Egyptian president Hosni Mubarak. Placed twenty-fifth on the Kadima list, Hasson retained his seat in the 2009 elections.

Placed second on the Kadima list for the 2013 elections, Hasson was re-elected as the party won two seats. However, he resigned from the Knesset in December 2014 after being appointed Director of the Israel Antiquities Authority. He was replaced by Yuval Zellner.

References

External links

Israel Hasson Yisrael Beiteinu

1955 births
Living people
Politicians from Damascus
Syrian Jews
Syrian emigrants to Israel
Israeli people of Syrian-Jewish descent
Israeli Jews
Yisrael Beiteinu politicians
Kadima politicians
Members of the 17th Knesset (2006–2009)
Members of the 18th Knesset (2009–2013)
Members of the 19th Knesset (2013–2015)
People of the Shin Bet